The 2015 Blu-Express.com Tennis Cup was a professional tennis tournament played on clay courts. It was the 1st edition of the tournament which was part of the 2015 ATP Challenger Tour. It took place in Perugia, Italy between 15 and 22 June 2015.

Singles main-draw entrants

Seeds

 1 Rankings are as of June 8, 2015.

Other entrants
The following players received wildcards into the singles main draw:
  Salvatore Caruso
  Flavio Cipolla
  Gianluca Mager
  Stefano Travaglia

The following players used protected ranking to gain entry into the main draw:
  José Checa Calvo

The following players entered the main draw as an alternate:
  Adrian Sikora

The following players received entry from the qualifying draw:
  Andrea Collarini
  Lorenzo Giustino
  Adelchi Virgili
  Jesse Witten

Doubles main-draw entrants

Seeds

1 Rankings as of May 25, 2015.

Other entrants
The following pairs received wildcards into the doubles main draw:
  Gianluigi Quinzi /  Stefano Travaglia
  Alessio di Mauro /  Nicolò Schilirò
  Salvatore Caruso /  Federico Gaio

The following pairs used protected ranking to gain entry into the doubles main draw:
  James Cerretani /  Adam Hubble

Champions

Singles

 Pablo Carreño Busta def.  Matteo Viola 6–2, 6–2

Doubles

 Andrea Collarini /  Andrés Molteni def.  James Cerretani /  Costin Pavăl 6–3, 7–5

External links
Official Website

Blu-Express.com Tennis Cup
Internazionali di Tennis Città di Perugia
June 2015 sports events in Italy
2015 in Italian tennis